"Paperlate" is a song from the second of two EPs by the British rock group Genesis. The EP, titled 3×3 (for it featured three tracks and the band comprised three musicians), peaked at No. 10 on the UK Singles Chart in mid-1982. The success of the EP led to an appearance on Top of the Pops. In the U.S., "Paperlate" was released as a standard single, backed by "You Might Recall". It was also featured on the U.S. version of the band's Three Sides Live album, of which all three tracks from the 3×3 EP are included on side four.

History
The title came from a line in the 1973 Genesis song "Dancing with the Moonlit Knight" ("Paper late, cried a voice in the crowd"), which Genesis rehearsed at a soundcheck, leading to the conception of the song. "Paperlate" is one of two Genesis songs that features the Earth, Wind & Fire horn section, the other being "No Reply at All", also from the Abacab sessions. Collins has often hired the group for other projects, including his debut solo album, Face Value. A music video was also created, utilising the band's 27 May 1982 appearance on Top of the Pops.

Reception
Dave Thompson of AllMusic said that "Paperlate" was 3×3's selling point, and describes the song as "a horn-honking romp with just the ghosts of '60s soul playing around its chorus and a buoyancy that fed readily into the mood of the U.K. charts of the day." Dw. Dunphy of Popdose commented that while catchy and enjoyable, "Paperlate" is "a definite cousin to 'No Reply At All', both songs employing the same tempo, attitude, and the Earth, Wind, and Fire horn section."

Upon release, Billboard praised Phil Collins' vocals and the horn section. Cash Box noted a resemblance to Collins' solo single "I Missed Again".

3×3'''s lead song was "Paperlate", and the EP debuted at No. 30 on the UK charts, peaking at No. 10 later on. "Paperlate" became a Top 40 hit in the U.S. and Germany, peaking at No. 36 in the German Charts, No. 32 on the U.S. Billboard charts, and No. 2 on the U.S. Mainstream Rock Charts.

Artwork
The cover artwork is a homage to the design of The Beatles' 1963 Twist and Shout'' EP, with similar typography and with the band jumping in the air.

References

1982 singles
Genesis (band) songs
Songs written by Tony Banks (musician)
Songs written by Phil Collins
Songs written by Mike Rutherford
1981 songs
Charisma Records singles